Mesothen petosiris is a moth of the subfamily Arctiinae. It was described by Herbert Druce in 1883. It is found in Ecuador and Bolivia.

References

 

Mesothen (moth)
Moths described in 1883